The Colombian Community and Communal Political Movement (Movimiento Comunal y Comunitario de Colombia) was a populist and civic political party in Colombia. 
At the legislative elections on 10 March 2002, the party was one of the many small parties with parliamentary representation.  In the election of 2006, the party won no seats.

Political parties in Colombia